In Aztec mythology, the god Nanahuatzin or Nanahuatl (or Nanauatzin, the suffix -tzin implies respect or familiarity), the most humble of the gods, sacrificed himself in fire so that he would continue to shine on Earth as the Sun, thus becoming the sun god. Nanahuatzin means "full of sores." According to a translation of the Histoyre du Mechique, Nanahuatzin is the son of Itzpapalotl and Cuzcamiahu or Tonan, but was adopted by Piltzintecuhtli and Xōchiquetzal. In the Codex Borgia, Nanahuatzin is represented as a man emerging from a fire. This was originally interpreted as an illustration of cannibalism. He is probably an aspect of Xolotl.

Aztec tradition 
The Aztecs had various myths about the creation, and Nanahuatzin participates in several. In the legend of Quetzalcoatl, Nanahuatzin helps Quetzalcoatl to obtain the first grains which will be the food of humankind. In Aztec mythology, the universe is not permanent or everlasting, but subject to death like any living creature. However, even as it dies, the universe is reborn again into a new age, or "Sun." Nanahuatzin is best known from the "Legend of the Fifth Sun" as related by Bernardino de Sahagún.

In this legend, which is the basis for most Nanahuatl myths, there had been four creations. In each one, one god has taken on the task of serving as the sun: Tezcatlipoca, Quetzalcoatl, Tlaloc, and Chalchiuhtlicue. Each age ended because the gods were not satisfied with the human beings that they had created. Finally, Quetzalcoatl with the aid of Xolotl retrieves the sacred bones of their ancestors, mixes them with corn and his own blood, and manages to make acceptable human beings. However, no other god wants the task of being the Sun.

The gods decide that the fifth, and possibly last, sun must offer up his life as a sacrifice in fire. Two gods are chosen: Tecciztecatl and Nanahuatzin. The former is chosen to serve as the Sun because he is wealthy and strong, while the latter will serve as the Moon because he is poor and ill. Tecciztecatl, who is proud, sees his impending sacrifice and transformation as an opportunity to gain immortality. The humble Nanahuatzin accepts because he sees it as his duty. During the days before the sacrifice, both gods undergo purification. Tecciztecatl makes offerings of rich gifts and coral. Nanahuatzin offers his blood and performs acts of penance.

The gods prepare a large bonfire that burns for four days, and construct a platform high above it from which the two chosen gods must leap into the flames. On the appointed day, Tecciztecatl and Nanahuatzin seat themselves upon the platform, awaiting the moment of sacrifice. The gods call upon Tecciztecatl to immolate himself first. After four attempts to throw himself onto the pyre, which is giving off extremely strong heat by this time, his courage fails him and he desists. Disgusted at Tecciztecatl's cowardice, the gods call upon Nanahuatzin, who rises from his seat and steps calmly to the edge of the platform. Closing his eyes, he leaps from the edge, landing in the very center of the fire. His pride wounded upon seeing that Nanahuatzin had the courage that he lacked, Tecciztecatl jumps upon the burning pyre after him.

Nothing happens at first, but eventually two suns appear in the sky. One of the gods, angry over Tecciztecatl's lack of courage, takes a rabbit and throws it in Tecciztecatl's face, causing him to lose his brilliance. Tecciztecatl thus becomes the moon, which bears the impression of a rabbit to this very day. Yet the Sun remains unmoving in the sky, parching and burning all the ground beneath. Finally the gods realize that they, too, must allow themselves to be sacrificed so that human beings may live. They present themselves to the god Ehecatl, who offers them up one by one. Then, with the powerful wind that arises as a result of their sacrifice, Ehecatl makes the Sun move through the sky, nourishing the earth rather than scorching it.

Nanahuatzin and Xolotl 

A close relationship between Xolotl and Nanahuatzin exists. Xolotl is probably identical with Nanahuatl.
Seler characterizes Nanahuatzin ("Little Pustule Covered One"), who is deformed by syphilis, as an aspect of Xolotl in his capacity as god of monsters, deforming diseases, and deformities. The syphilitic god Nanahuatzin is an avatar of Xolotl.

Salvadoran Nawat tradition 
The fifth sun is identified with Tonatiuh, Nanahuatzin was the youngest of three boys and a girl named "Xochit Sihuat" who had emerged from the fruit of the gourd-tree (Crescentia cujete), which in turn had grown from the head of a woman that had flown into the night while her body slept. (The head attached itself to a startled deer, and the deer leapt into a canyon, there planting the head in the ground.) Nanahuatzin and his siblings were raised by Tantepus Lamat ("Iron-Toothed Old Woman") until she gave to her lover some food they had obtained. The siblings proceeded to butcher that lover and, calling it venison, fed his body to the old woman, then killed her. The siblings found the world's supply of maize was concealed within a mountain, known only to a bird feeding on that stock. Where his siblings had failed, Nanahuatzin succeeded in opening the mountain, but in doing so, was himself trapped within.

See also
 List of solar deities

Sources 

Aztec gods
Solar gods
Plague gods
Quetzalcoatl